Tom Bacher is a former Danish badminton player. He was a Danish international from the mid 1960s until the mid 1970s.  
His greatest achievement was winning the 1970 All England Badminton Championships doubles title with Poul Petersen.

Medal Record at the All England Badminton Championships

References

Danish male badminton players